At the April 1995 general conference of the Church of Jesus Christ of Latter-day Saints (LDS Church), church president Gordon B. Hinckley announced the creation of a new leadership position known as the area authority. In 1997, area authorities were renamed area authority seventies and ordained to the office of seventy. The church announced that these seventies would become members of a Quorum of the Seventy based upon the geographic region to which they were assigned. Later, the title "area authority seventy" was shortened to area seventy, which is the title currently in use.

Formation of the various Quorums of the Seventy

Third, Fourth, and Fifth quorums 
When area authority seventies were first called in 1997, the Third, Fourth, and Fifth Quorums were created. At that time, the Third Quorum consisted of those seventies living in the church's Europe, Africa, Asia, Australia, and Pacific areas. The Fourth Quorum comprised those living in the Mexico, Central America, and South America areas. The Fifth Quorum of the Seventy comprised those living in the United States and Canada

Sixth Quorum 
In July 2004, the Sixth Quorum of the Seventy was organized from the Fifth Quorum because the number of quorum members exceeded 70, the number of members prescribed by scripture. The Fifth Quorum then comprised area seventies serving in the church's North America Northwest, North America West, Idaho, Utah North, Utah Salt Lake City, and Utah South areas, while the Sixth Quorum comprised those living in the North America Central, North America East, North America Northeast, North America Southeast, and North America Southwest areas.

Seventh and Eighth quorums 
In July 2005, the church announced that, due to the great distance members of the Third and Fourth Quorums of the Seventy had to travel to meet as quorums, the Seventh and Eighth Quorums of the Seventy would be created. The Third Quorum included those area seventies living in the church's Africa Southeast, Africa West, Europe Central, Europe East, and Europe West areas. The Fourth Quorum included those members living in the Brazil North, Brazil South, Chile, and South America South areas. The Fourth Quorum included those living in the Central America, Mexico North, Mexico South, South America North, and South America West areas.

Ninth, Tenth, Eleventh, and Twelfth quorums 
On May 19, 2020, the church announced the creation of the Ninth, Tenth, Eleventh, and Twelfth Quorums of the Seventy, to enhance Quorum functionality, improve geographic alignment, and enhance cultural and language similarities among quorum members. The announcement also noted the adjustments would assist members of the Quorum of the Twelve Apostles and Presidency of the Seventy in providing more time and greater convenience in interactions with area seventies around the world. Additionally, the church announced changes in the geographical makeup of each quorum, with the composition of each of the now-ten quorums of area seventies being alphabetical by church area. These changes will take effect on June 1, 2020.

The quorums will be geographically aligned with those serving in the church's international areas as follows: Third–Africa, Fourth–Asia, Fifth–Brazil, Sixth–Caribbean, Central America, and Mexico areas, Seventh–Europe and Middle East/Africa North areas, Eighth–Philippines and Pacific Islands, and Ninth–South America areas.

The final three quorums will consist those serving North America, with the North America Central, North America Northeast, and North America Southeast areas comprising the Tenth Quorum, those in the Western United States as the Eleventh Quorum, and Utah area seventies as the Twelfth Quorum.

Sustaining/releasing changes 
In 2021, following a hiatus due to the COVID-19 pandemic and its related restrictions, leadership training was held in conjunction with the April general conference. As part of that leadership training, church president Russell M. Nelson announced a change to how area seventies would be sustained each April going forward. Rather than having a large list of individual names for new area seventies read over the pulpit during a session of general conference, when other changes in general leadership would be presented, the list of 77 new area seventies for 2021 was read in the leadership session, after which Nelson called for a sustaining vote of those individuals.

Since the list of names had been presented earlier, during the traditional Saturday afternoon sustaining to changes in church leadership, Dallin H. Oaks offered the following statement: "It is proposed that we sustain the new Area Seventies as announced by the Church earlier this week."

Subsequently, in July, M. Russell Ballard, Acting President of the Quorum of the Twelve Apostles, sent out a letter noting a list of 66 area seventies who would be released effective August 1. The letter noted that the releases of area seventies would continue to be announced by letter going forward, and those releases would continue to be effective August 1 (which marks the same day each year on which most other area or church headquarters assignments are adjusted). During the Saturday afternoon session, members were asked to give a vote of appreciation for those who had been released during the past year.

Areas consolidated over the years 
In the intervening years, along with the changes announced in quorum composition, the church's geographic areas were consolidated and realigned. Now each quorum is composed of area seventies in the following areas:
 Third Quorum: Africa Central, Africa South, and Africa West Areas 
 Fourth Quorum: Asia and Asia North Areas
 Fifth Quorum: Brazil Area
 Sixth Quorum: Caribbean, Central America, and Mexico Areas.
 Seventh Quorum: Europe Central, Europe East, Europe North, and Middle East/Africa North Areas
 Eighth Quorum:  Pacific and Philippines areas.
 Ninth Quorum: South America Northwest and South America South areas.
 Tenth Quorum: North America Central, North America Northeast, and North America Southeast Areas
 Eleventh Quorum: North America Southwest and North America West Areas
 Twelfth Quorum: Utah Area

Current area seventies 

Below is a list of the 289 currently-serving area seventies, as of October 2022:

See also

 List of general authorities of the Church of Jesus Christ of Latter-day Saints
 List of general officers of the Church of Jesus Christ of Latter-day Saints

References 

 
Area seventies
Area seventies